Donald Daniel Leslie (1922–2020) was a British-born Australian historian, especially known for his work on the Chinese Jews of Kaifeng, his books The Survival of the Chinese Jews (1972) and Les juifs de Chine (1980;co-authored with Joseph Dehergne) bringing the community to broader Western attention, through his "unique expertise" in Hebrew and Chinese.  He also wrote on Chinese Islam and on religious minorities in the PRC in general.

Born to a Jewish family in Tottenham, London, he served in World War II and subsequently studied Chinese at SOAS. He then earned an M.A. from Cambridge and a Ph.D. at the College of Sorbonne (1962), having also held a research fellowship in Israel. He accepted a permanent position at Australian National University and later held visiting positions at Kyoto University. From 1970 to 1973 he worked at Tel Aviv University before returning to Australia to teach at the University of Canberra. In retirement he retained an affiliation with ANU.

References

1922 births
2020 deaths
Australian historians
Alumni of SOAS University of London
Alumni of the University of Cambridge
College of Sorbonne alumni
Academic staff of the Australian National University
Academic staff of Kyoto University
Academic staff of Tel Aviv University
Academic staff of the University of Canberra
English Jewish writers
Jewish Australian academics
20th-century Australian historians
21st-century Australian historians
20th-century English historians
21st-century English historians
Jewish historians
Australian people of English-Jewish descent
Historians of China
British military personnel of World War II
British emigrants to Australia
British expatriates in France
Australian expatriates in Israel
Australian expatriates in Japan